Coty may refer to:

Coty (beauty company), an American-French beauty products manufacturer
Coty Award, the Coty American Fashion Critics' Awards (1943-1984) by Coty, Inc.
COTY, abbreviation for Car of the Year awards

People
 François Coty (1874–1934), perfume maker and founder of Coty, Inc.
 Pierre-Marie Coty (1927–2020), Ivorian catholic priest
 René Coty (1882–1962), President of France
 Coty Clarke (born 1992), American basketball player in the Israeli Basketball Premier League
 Coty Sensabaugh (born 1988), American football player

See also

 Cotys (disambiguation)
 Koty (disambiguation)